"" ("And the stars were shining") is a romantic aria from the third act of Giacomo Puccini's opera Tosca from 1900, composed to an Italian libretto by Luigi Illica and Giuseppe Giacosa. It is sung in act 3 by Mario Cavaradossi (tenor), a painter in love with the singer Tosca, while he waits for his execution on the roof of Castel Sant'Angelo.

Written in B minor, it is one of the most famous opera arias. The vocal range extends from F3 to A4. The aria is considered part of the spinto tenor repertoire.

The aria is introduced by a somber clarinet solo. The incipit of the melody (heard in outline earlier in the act, as the sky lightens and the gaoler prepares for the execution) is repeated on the lines "" ("Oh, sweet kisses and languorous caresses"), and also restated in forte in the closing bars of the opera, as Tosca jumps from the ramparts.

Libretto

Plagiarism suit
In 1920, the stage performer Al Jolson, together with Buddy DeSylva and Vincent Rose, wrote a popular song, "Avalon", about the town of the same name on Santa Catalina island. The following year, G. Ricordi, the publisher of Puccini's operas, sued all parties associated with the song, arguing that the melody was lifted from "". Puccini and his publisher prevailed in the case and were awarded $25,000 in damages and all future royalties for the song.

References

Further reading
Detailed musical analysis of the aria can be found in Mosco Carner, Giacomo Puccini, Tosca, Cambridge University Press, 1985, pp. 101–104 and in Julian Budden Puccini: His Life and Works, Oxford University Press, 2002, pp. 218–219.
The text for the original version of the aria which Puccini later shortened for subsequent editions of the libretto can be found in Susan VanDiver Nicassio, Tosca's Rome: The Play and the Opera in Historical Perspective, University of Chicago Press, 2002, p. 307.
An analysis of the theme of female unveiling in this aria and other operas of the time can be found in Jeremy Tambling, Opera and the Culture of Fascism, Oxford University Press, 1996. p. 122.

External links

Details, Aria Database
, Alfredo Kraus

Arias by Giacomo Puccini
Opera excerpts
1900 compositions
Compositions in B minor
Tenor arias
Arias in Italian